Purpureostemon is a genus of plant in the myrtle family Myrtaceae described as a genus in 1939. There is only one known species, Purpureostemon ciliatus, endemic to New Caledonia. Purpureostemon is related to Xanthostemon.

References

Myrtaceae
Monotypic Myrtaceae genera
Endemic flora of New Caledonia